State Road 123 (SR 123) is a north–south state highway that bypasses the stretch of State Road 85 through Niceville, Florida.  The highway is a more direct route to Fort Walton Beach from points north. With flyover ramps at both intersections of SR 85 now completed, the highway has been widened into a 4-lane divided highway.

Route description
SR 123 begins at an intersection with SR 85 north of Northwest Florida Regional Airport to the southwest of Niceville in Okaloosa County, heading north-northeast on two-lane undivided Roger J. Clary Highway. The road passes through forested areas on the grounds of Eglin Air Force Base, bypassing Niceville to the west. SR 123 reaches its northern terminus at another intersection with SR 85 northwest of Niceville.

History 
Construction work on the $25.6 million State Road (S.R.) 85/123 flyover project in Okaloosa County is complete. The main feature of the project is a new flyover ramp that seamlessly connects S.R. 85 northbound to S.R. 123 northbound.
The project also includes widening S.R. 85 to six lanes between General Bond Boulevard and the Northwest Florida Regional Airport. In addition, the travel lanes adjacent to the airport have been elevated to create a safer and more efficient airport entrance.
More than 30,000 drivers travel State Roads 85 and 123 each day between Fort Walton Beach and the suburbs of Niceville, Valparaiso and Crestview, and northern Okaloosa County. The roads, and their connection to Interstate 10, form an important economic development corridor that supports the tourism industry, Eglin AFB and the Northwest Florida Regional Airport.
In addition, the Florida Department of Transportation (FDOT) is currently designing a similar flyover ramp to better connect S.R. 123 northbound to S.R. 85 just south of Crestview. Work on that project is slated to begin in 2014.
Work on the current S.R. 85/123 flyover project began in 2009. Anderson Columbia, Co., Inc. served as the construction contractor, with Greenhorne & O’Mara, Inc. providing construction engineering and inspection services for FDOT.

Major intersections

References 

123
123